So the Moon Rises is a Canadian drama film, directed by Marie-Jan Seille and released in 2004. The film stars Isabelle Leblanc as Aimée, a young woman who is dying of AIDS, and France Castel as Francine, her longtime friend who is acting as her caretaker.

The cast also includes Nathalie Mallette, Dominique Pétin, Denis Bernard, Jean Leloup, Emmanuel Bilodeau and Claude Léveillée.
 
The film opened theatrically in October 2004.

Charles Papasoff received a Genie Award nomination for Best Original Score at the 25th Genie Awards.

References

External links

2004 films
2004 drama films
Canadian drama films
Quebec films
HIV/AIDS in Canadian films
French-language Canadian films
2000s Canadian films